Bunge Land or Zemlya Bunge is a huge empty and almost barren intermediate zone in the Anzhu Islands north of Siberia. It is located between Kotelny and Faddeyevsky, which, unlike Bunge Land, could be described as proper islands. Sandy and flat, its area is 6,200 km².

Since most of its surface rises only to a maximum height of 8 m above sea level, Bunge Land is flooded during storm surges, except for a very small area in the southeast that rises to an elevation of 11 to 21 m above sea level. The area that is periodically submerged accounts for over 80% of the total surface and is practically devoid of vegetation.

Bunge Land is named after Russian zoologist and explorer Alexander Alexandrovich Bunge.

References 

Anzhu Islands
Wetlands of Russia
Landforms of the Sakha Republic